The 2016 Clare Senior Football Championship was the 121st staging of the Clare Senior Football Championship since its establishment by the Clare County Board in 1887.

The defending champions and holders of the Jack Daly Cup were St. Joseph's, Miltown Malbay who as rank outsiders bridged a 25-year gap from their last title in 1990 to become county champions for the thirteenth time.

Fixtures/results

First round
 8 winners advance to Round 2 (winners).
 8 losers move to Round 2 (Losers).

Second round

Winners
 4 winners advance to Quarter-final.
 4 losers move to Round 3.

Losers
 4 winners advance to Round 3.
 4 losers divert to Relegation Play-offs.

Third round
 4 winners advance to Quarter-final.
 4 losers divert to Senior B Championship.

Quarter-finals

Semi-finals

Final

References

External links

Clare Senior Football Championship
Clare Senior Football Championship